The 1964–65 Regionalliga  was the second Regionalliga season. The league operated in five regional divisions, Berlin, North, South, Southwest and West. The five league champions and the runners-up from the west, south, southwest and north then entered a promotion play-off to determine the two clubs to move up to the Bundesliga for the next season. Western and southern champions Borussia Mönchengladbach and FC Bayern Munich were promoted. Additionally, the third placed team in Berlin, SC Tasmania 1900 Berlin, was also promoted to replace Hertha BSC, which had their Bundesliga licence revoked.

North
The 1964–65 season saw two new clubs in the league, SC Göttingen 05 and Rasensport Harburg, both promoted from the Amateurliga while no club had been relegated from the Bundesliga to the league.

Top goalscorers
The top goal scorers in the Regionalliga Nord:

Berlin
The 1964–65 season saw one new club in the league, Viktoria 89 Berlin, promoted from the Amateurliga Berlin, while no club had been relegated from the Bundesliga to the league. After a home-and-away round of 18 games each the league was split into a championship and a relegation round with five clubs each. Because Tennis Borussia Berlin failed in the promotion round and Spandauer SV declined SC Tasmania 1900 Berlin was directly promoted to the Bundesliga to replace Hertha BSC which had its licence revoked.

West
The 1964–65 season saw three new clubs in the league, Eintracht Gelsenkirchen and Homberger SV, promoted from the Verbandsliga, while Preußen Münster had been relegated from the Bundesliga to the league.

Top goalscorers
The top goal scorers in the Regionalliga Wset:

South-West
The 1964–65 season saw two new clubs in the league, Germania Metternich, promoted from the Amateurliga, while 1. FC Saarbrücken had been relegated from the Bundesliga to the league.

Top goalscorers
The top goal scorers in the Regionalliga Südwest:

South
The 1964–65 season saw three new clubs in the league, SV Darmstadt 98, promoted from the Amateurliga Hessen, FC Wacker München, promoted from the Amateurliga Bayern, and FC Emmendingen, promoted from the Amateurliga Südbaden, while no club had been relegated from the Bundesliga to the league.

Top goalscorers
The top goal scorers in the Regionalliga Süd:

Bundesliga promotion round

Qualifying
The runners-up of the Regionalliga Nord and Regionalliga Süd played a two-leg decider to determine which team qualified for the group stage, which SSV Reutlingen won on aggregate.

|}

Group 1

Group 2

References

External links
Regionalliga on the official DFB website 
kicker 

1964-65
2
Ger